Petrovič is a Slovenian and Slovak surname. Notable people with this surname include:

Alexander Petrovič, Slovak name of Sándor Petőfi, Hungarian poet of Slovak origin
Alojz Petrovič (born 12 May 1936) is a Croatian gymnast
Dejan Petrovič (born 12 January 1998) is a Slovenian football player 
Rok Petrovič, (5 February 1966 – 16 September 1993) was a Yugoslav and Slovenian alpine skier
Tomaž Petrovič (born 17 April 1979) is a Slovenian football manager

Slovene-language surnames
Slovak-language surnames